Alfonso de Aragón y Portugal, or Alfonso I de Ampurias (Segorbe, 1489–1563), was Count of Ampurias and Duke of Segorbe.

Biography
He was a son of Enrique de Aragón y Pimentel and Guiomar de Portugal, and succeeded his father as Count of Ampurias and 2nd Duke of Segorbe after his death in 1522.
In 1516 he married Duchess Juana I Folch de Cardona, 3rd Duke of Cardona, daughter and heiress of Fernando Ramon Folch, 2nd Duke of Cardona. This made him 3rd Duke-consort of Cardona. 
He was viceroy of Valencia from 1558 until his death in 1563.
In 1555 he became a Knight in the Order of the Golden Fleece.

Children
They had 13 children, including:

Francisco de Aragón (1539–1572), his successor
Guiomar de Aragón (1540–1557), married Fadrique Álvarez de Toledo, 4th Duke of Alba
Juana de Cardona (1542–1608), countess of Cardona and Duchess of Segorbe, after her brother's death.
Ana de Aragón (?–1567), married Vespasiano I Gonzaga.
Isabel de Aragón, married Juan Ximénez de Urrea, count of Aranda.

He also had at least one illegitimate child :
Pedro de Aragón (?–1597), Bishop of Lérida, Vich and Jaca.

Sources
 Fundacion Medinaceli

Knights of the Golden Fleece
Dukes of Spain
Viceroys of Valencia
1563 deaths
1489 births